Some familiar household synthetic polymers include: Nylons in textiles and fabrics, Teflon in non-stick pans, Bakelite for electrical switches, polyvinyl chloride (PVC) in pipes, etc. The common PET bottles are made of a synthetic polymer, polyethylene terephthalate. The plastic kits and covers are mostly made of synthetic polymers like polythene, and tires are manufactured from Buna rubbers. However, due to the environmental issues created by these synthetic polymers which are mostly non-biodegradable and often synthesized from petroleum, alternatives like bioplastics are also being considered. They are however expensive when compared to the synthetic polymers.

Inorganic polymers 

Polysiloxane
Polyphosphazene
Polyborazyline

Organic polymers 

The eight most common types of synthetic organic polymers, which are commonly found in households are:
Low-density polyethylene (LDPE)
High-density polyethylene (HDPE)
Polypropylene (PP)
Polyvinyl chloride (PVC)
Polystyrene (PS)
Nylon, nylon 6, nylon 6,6
Teflon (Polytetrafluoroethylene)
Thermoplastic polyurethanes (TPU)

Brand names 

These polymers are often better known through their brand names, for instance:

Summary Chart

Plastic identification codes

See also 
Polymerization

RAFT (chemistry)

References 

Polymers
Artificial materials